Lê Văn Trung (Hán nôm: 黎文忠; 25 November 1876 – 19 November 1934) was the first acting Giáo Tông of Cao Đài.

The term Giáo Tông means “leader or head of a religious group”. Translators noticed similarities between the structural hierarchy of Caodaism and the Roman Catholic Church, and, for lack of better words or whatever reasons, borrowed terminologies such as pope, cardinal, bishop, priest, etc. In practice, Caodaiism has many more ranks and titles of which there are no official English translation yet. Also, the actual Vietnamese term for “pope”, as in “The Catholic Pope”, is Giáo Hoàng.

In 1926, Lê Văn Trung believed a great Chinese poet had contacted him during a séance to give him a religious mission in life. This led to his signing the “Declaration of the Founding of the Cao Đài Religion” on 7 October 1926. This formally announced the founding of the religion to the world. The declaration he signed affirmed principles that combined Buddhism, Taoism, Confucianism, Christianity, spiritism and others.

Before this, Ngô Văn Chiêu had declined his appointment as Pope and withdrew to represent a more esoteric form of the faith. Lê Văn Trung took the more exoteric approach, becoming their leader and acting Pope. After Trung's death (disincarnation) in 1934, the Venerable Phạm Công Tắc, who was also the Maintainer of the Laws/Dharma, assumed the role.

References

Religious Movements on Cao Daism
PBS on Cao Đài 
Sydney Centre for Studies in Caodaism

Vietnamese religious leaders
1934 deaths
Caodaism
Vietnamese Caodaists
Place of birth missing
Place of death missing
1876 births